Ernesto Pérez d'Angelo (1932 –  2013) was a Chilean geologist and paleontologist. He is known for his contributions to the development of paleontology in Chile. His contributions include the organizing of paleontology libraries and fossil collections and the description of numerous new taxa of the Mesozoic. From 1986 to 1997 he was editor of Revista Geológica de Chile.

References

20th-century Chilean geologists
Chilean paleontologists
Paleozoologists
1932 births
2013 deaths
People from Punta Arenas
20th-century zoologists